Lithopoma tuber, common name the green star shell, is a species of large sea snail, a marine gastropod mollusk in the family Turbinidae, the turban snails.

Description 
The size of the shell varies between 25 mm and 75 mm. The imperforate, very solid shell has a turbinate-conic shape.  Its color pattern is dirty white or pale green, radiately maculated with brown above, irregularly marked and lighter below. The shell contains six whorls. The upper two are smooth by erosion, the following whorls are obliquely coarsely plicate and finely wrinkled in the same direction above, somewhat shouldered. They are obtusely angular near the periphery, above which several obscure beaded lirae revolve, shagreened by intersection of incremental striae and oblique wrinkles. The base of the shell is nearly smooth. The oval aperture is very oblique and silvery within. The short columella is wide, and generally bituberculate at the base, excavated over the location of the umbilicus.

The operculum is oval, its nucleus sublateral. Its outside is white or slightly brownish, very convex, nearly smooth, and excavated near the center.

Distribution
This marine species occurs off Southeast Florida, USA and off the West Indies.

Habitat 
This species occurs at depths between 0 m and 30 m.

References

 Linnaeus, C. 1758. Systema Naturae. 10th ed., vol. 1: 824 pp. Laurentii Salvii: Holmiae
 Röding, P. F. 1798. Museum Boltenianum.  viii + 199 pp. Hamburg.
 Verrill, A. H. 1950. New subspecies from the West Indies. Conchological Club of Southern California, Minutes 101: 5–7.
 Turgeon, D.; Quinn, J.F.; Bogan, A.E.; Coan, E.V.; Hochberg, F.G.; Lyons, W.G.; Mikkelsen, P.M.; Neves, R.J.; Roper, C.F.E.; Rosenberg, G.; Roth, B.; Scheltema, A.; Thompson, F.G.; Vecchione, M.; Williams, J.D. (1998). Common and scientific names of aquatic invertebrates from the United States and Canada: mollusks. 2nd ed. American Fisheries Society Special Publication, 26. American Fisheries Society: Bethesda, MD (USA). . IX, 526 + cd-rom pp.

External links
 

tuber
Gastropods described in 1758
Taxa named by Carl Linnaeus